Platyptilia strictiformis is a moth of the family Pterophoridae. It is known from the Democratic Republic of Congo, Tanzania and Uganda.

References

strictiformis
Insects of the Democratic Republic of the Congo
Insects of Uganda
Insects of Tanzania
Moths of Africa
Moths described in 1932